PolyGram Polska Sp. z o.o. (PolyGram Poland), was a Polish subsidiary of PolyGram. The label was founded in 1994 in Warsaw when independent record label Izabelin Studio was brought by PolyGram.

Label was closed in 1998 when PolyGram, within its Polish subsidiary was brought by Seagram and Universal Music Group was formed. PolyGram Polska catalogue have been taken over by Universal Music Polska.

PolyGram Polska bestselling artists included Edyta Bartosiewicz and Katarzyna Kowalska among others, with several albums certified Gold and Platinum in Poland.

Selected artists

 Anna Maria Jopek 
 Aya RL
 Closterkeller
 Edyta Bartosiewicz
 Elektryczne Gitary
 Hey
 Illusion
 Katarzyna Kowalska
 Katarzyna Nosowska
 Magma
 Maleo Reggae Rockers
 Maryla Rodowicz
 Natalia Kukulska
 Norbi
 Patrycja Kosiarkiewicz
 Perfect
 Proletaryat  
 Rotary
 Sixteen
 Stare Miasto
 Subway
 Sweet Noise
 T-raperzy znad Wisły
 Wojciech Pilichowski

See also
 BMG Poland
 EMI Music Poland
 Sony Music Entertainment Poland
 Sony BMG Music Entertainment Poland
 Warner Music Poland

References

Polish record labels
Record labels established in 1994
Companies disestablished in 1998